Germanicus is an opera by Georg Philipp Telemann, to a libretto in German by the poet , fourth daughter of Nicolaus Adam Strungk of Dresden. The opera was written in 1704 and revised in 1710. It is supposedly one of the twenty operas that Telemann wrote for the opera house in the Oper am Brühl in Leipzig.

The plot concerns the Roman general Germanicus. The opera was believed lost until 45 arias were discovered in a Frankfurt archive by Michael Maul. The opera was premiered with spoken text between arias at the Bachfest Leipzig 2007 and at the 2010 Magdeburg Telemann Festival under conductor Gotthold Schwarz. A recording was released by cpo in 2011.

Recording 
 Gotthold Schwarz (conductor), Germanicus, Label: CPO, DDD, 2010, 3 CDs. With Olivia Stahn, Elisabeth Scholl, Matthias Rexroth, Henryk Böhm, Tobias Berndt, Sächsisches Barockorchester, ASIN: B005UU066S

References 

Operas
1704 operas
Operas by Georg Philipp Telemann
German-language operas
Operas based on real people
Operas set in antiquity
Operas set in Italy
Operas set in Germany
Cultural depictions of Germanicus
Operas set in the 1st century
Operas set in ancient Rome